NTV 101 is a Bosnian commercial television channel based in Sanski Most. The program is mainly produced in Bosnian language.

External links 
 

Television stations in Bosnia and Herzegovina
Television channels and stations established in 1998